Grace Krilanovich (born October 5, 1979) is an American author. Her first novel, The Orange Eats Creeps was published by Two Dollar Radio in September 2010. It was selected as one of Amazon's Best Books of the Year (2010) in the category of Science Fiction & Fantasy and was named a Top 10 Book of 2010 by Shelf Unbound.

In October 2010, she was selected as a National Book Foundation 2010 "5 Under 35" Honoree, selected by Scott Spencer, Fiction Finalist for A Ship Made of Paper, 2003; Fiction Finalist for Endless Love, 1980 and 1981.

Biography
Grace Krilanovich moved to the Los Angeles area from Santa Cruz, California in 2003. She attended San Francisco State University for her undergraduate studies, where she received a Bachelor of Arts degree in American Studies. She then went on to receive a Master of Fine Arts in Writing at the California Institute of the Arts, where she graduated in 2005. She currently works at The Los Angeles Times.

Work
Excerpts from The Orange Eats Creeps appeared in Issue 3 and Issue 7 of Black Clock. Her essay on the subject of shock rocker GG Allin and Jefferson Airplane singer Grace Slick appeared in Issue 4: "Guilty Pleasures & Lost Causes." Krilanovich is named after Slick.

Black Clock editor and novelist Steve Erickson wrote the introduction to The Orange Eats Creeps.

The artwork of Mat Brinkman appears on the cover and opposite the title page of The Orange Eats Creeps.

Krilanovich has been a MacDowell Colony fellow, and was a finalist for the 2009 Starcherone Prize.

Krilanovich "is currently at work on a novel set in 1870s California." "More hobos. More neurotic trances. More aprons. A girl and a boy have nightmares about each other."

Krilanovich will be directing The Removals, written by Nicholas Rombes, produced by Two Dollar Radio Moving Pictures, for release in 2015.

The Orange Eats Creeps is being developed into a feature film.

References

External links
 Grace Krilanovich Discusses The Removals (video) (October 2013)
 Audio of Grace Krilanovich reading from The Orange Eats Creeps (May 2012)
 Grace Krilanovich on Kids of the Black Hole: Punk Rock in Postsuburban California (August 2011)
 Grace Krilanovich reads a passage from The Orange Eats Creeps (August 2011)
 What Film Haunts You? #1: Gilda by Grace Krilanovich (April 2011)
 Micro story by Grace Krilanovich
 Grace Krilanovich: What it's like being one of 5 under 35 (December 2010)
 Grace Krilanovich interview and reading at 2010 5 Under 35 celebration (2010)
 The Orange Eats Creeps Author Grace Krilanovich on Her Top 10 Books of 2010 (December 2010)
 5 Recent Reads with Grace Krilanovich (September 2010)
 Book Notes – Grace Krilanovich ("The Orange Eats Creeps") (September 2010)
 Book Notes music playlist on YouTube
 Grace Krilanovich's Twitter account
 Grace Krilanovich on Etsy
 The Orange Eats Creeps – book trailer
 Short Reading (by Ricky Grove) of "The Orange Eats Creeps"

Interviews
 The Future of American Fiction: An Interview with Grace Krilanovich (July 2012)
 The Questionnaire: Grace Krilanovich (March 2012)
 Giving Birth To Creeps: Interview on Chuck Palahniuk's fansite (June 2011)
 Video interview of Grace Krilanovich at L.A. Times Festival of Books 2011 (May 2011)
 The L Mag Questionnaire for Writer Types: Grace Krilanovich (October 2010)
 Grace Krilanovich: Q+A With the Editor (August 2010)

21st-century American novelists
American women novelists
1979 births
Living people
California Institute of the Arts alumni
San Francisco State University alumni
Writers from Santa Cruz, California
21st-century American women writers
Los Angeles Times people